Chrome Island is the site of a light station in the Salish Sea/Georgia Strait on the coast of Vancouver Island in an area known as Baynes Sound.
  
The Island was known as Yellow Rock until 1940, when the name changed to prevent confusion with a similarly named island.  Archaeological studies have explored evidence of pre-contact human use including petroglyphs, human bones and a midden of discarded shells.

Gallery

References

Islands of British Columbia